Kim Kwang-soo (born 1954) is a South Korean neuroscientist.

Education
B.S. Seoul National University, Department of Microbiology (1977)
M.S. Korea Advanced Institute of Science and Technology (KAIST), Biological Science and Engineering (1979)
Ph.D. Korea Advanced Institute of Science and Technology (KAIST), Biological Science and Engineering (Dewey D. Ryu) (1983)
M.S.(hon.) Harvard Medical School, Neuroscience (2011)

Postdoctoral Training
Postdoc. Fellow, MIT, Dept. of Biology (Molecular Genetics; Lenny Guarente, 1983–1985)
Postdoc. Associate, MIT, Dept. of Biology (Molecular Genetics; Lenny Guarente, 1987–1989)

Work
Kim is a Professor and Director at the Molecular Neurobiology Laboratory, McLean Hospital, Harvard Medical School. He has over 20 year experiences to investigate molecular neurobiology of midbrain dopamine neuronal system in health and disease, focusing on elucidating the genetic network of intrinsic signaling molecules and extrinsic transcription factors for development and maintenance of dopamine neurons. He is also investigating stem cell biology and has pioneered to generate human induced pluripotent stem (iPS) cells by protein-based reprogramming methods and demonstrated that these protein-iPS cells can efficiently generate functional dopamine neurons. He is currently focused on translating his neuroscience and stem cell research to potential therapeutic development for brain disorders such as Parkinson's disease, Alzheimer's disease, and inflammatory diseases.

Awards

Scholarship from Seoul National University (1974–1977)
Graduated with the highest departmental honor (Department of Microbiology, Seoul National University) (1977)
Graduated with the highest departmental honor (Department of Biological Science and Technology, KAIST) (1979)
National Full Scholarship for Graduate Study at KAIST (1977–1982)
National Scholarship and Travel Award for the Study in U.S. (1983–1984)
First Award Grant from NIMH (1992–1998)
NARSAD Independent Award (2000–2005)
Society of Bioscience Research (SBR) Bioscience Award (2003)
Lead Reviewer Award from Stem Cells (2006)
NIH Director's Opportunity Grant (top 3%) (2010–2013)

External links
Department of Neurobiology
McLean Hospital Mailman Research Center

References

1954 births
Living people
Seoul National University alumni
KAIST alumni
South Korean biologists
McLean Hospital people